Captain Barbell is a Philippine television drama action fantasy series broadcast by GMA Network. The series is based on a Philippine fictional character of the same name created by Mars Ravelo. Directed by Don Michael Perez, it stars Richard Gutierrez in the title role. It premiered on May 29, 2006 on the network's Telebabad line-up. The series concluded on January 12, 2007 with a total of 165 episodes. It was replaced by Asian Treasures in its timeslot.

A sequel to the series Captain Barbell aired in 2011.

Cast and characters

Lead cast
 Richard Gutierrez as Captain Barbell / Arell / Potenciano "Teng" Magtanggol

Supporting cast
 Richard Gomez as Viel Villan / General V
 Patrick Garcia as Levi Villan / Super Levi
 Camille Prats as Marikit "Kit" Salvacion
 Rhian Ramos as Leah Lazaro
 JC de Vera as Boris / Little B
 Ryan Yllana as Bobby Santos
 Ricky Davao as Cesar Magtanggol
 Jackie Lou Blanco as Sandra Magtanggol
 Paolo Bediones as Captain B / Brando Laddran
 Angel Aquino as Barbara
 Snooky Serna as Mrs. B 
 Gloria Sevilla as Carmela "Melay" Magtanggol
 Dino Guevarra as Narciso / Bubog
 Jeremy Marquez as Jared / Putakti / Cyborg 5564
 Mike Gayoso as Dexter
 Gary Estrada as Tenorio / Tetano
 Carlos Morales as Ador / Adobe
 Rufa Mae Quinto and Marissa Sanchez as Patti / Aero / Aerobika
 Jay Aquitania as Marvin / Vaporo
 Jason Hsu as Xu / Cyborg 5566
 Pinky Amador as Myra Lazaro
 Wendell Ramos as Ruben / Black Out
 Elizabeth Oropesa as Aurora Salvacion / Lady Amorseko
 Bong Alvarez as Dribol / Askoboy Coach
 Antonio Aquitania as Askoboy Captain
 Dion Ignacio as Askoboy Vice Captain
 Mylene Dizon as Magna / Magnetica 
 John Lapus as Marlon "Mercy" / Mercurio
 January Isaac as Kristiana / Admiral K 
 Ian Veneracion as Commander X
 Sunshine Dizon as Clarisse Magtanggol / Blanca / Ex-O

Guest cast
 Ryan Eigenmann as Abel
 Melissa Avelino as Chari
 Dante Rivero as Carlos "Aloy" Magtanggol
 John Regala as Lorenzo Lazaro
 Rez Cortez as Joe Salvacion
 Tricia Roman as a television news reporter
 Ces Quesada as Agnes
 Pinky de Leon as Victoria
 Tin Arnaldo as Tracy

Ratings
According to AGB Nielsen Philippines' Mega Manila household television ratings, the pilot episode of Captain Barbell earned a 37.5% rating. While the final episode scored a 35.4% rating. The series had an average rating of 30.4%, while 43.7% was the highest rating it earned.

Accolades

References

External links
 

Captain Barbell
2006 Philippine television series debuts
2007 Philippine television series endings
Fantaserye and telefantasya
Filipino-language television shows
GMA Network drama series
Philippine action television series
Superhero television series
Television shows based on comics
Television shows set in the Philippines

tl:Captain Barbell